Flecktarn ("mottled camouflage"; also known as Flecktarnmuster or Fleckentarn) is a family of 3-, 4-, 5- or 6-color disruptive camouflage patterns, the most common being the five-color pattern, consisting of dark green, grey-green, red brown, and black over a light green or tan base depending on the manufacturer. The original German 5-color pattern was designed for use in European temperate woodland terrain. A 3-color variation called Tropentarn (formerly Wüstentarn) is intended for arid and desert conditions; the German Bundeswehr wore it in Afghanistan.

The original German 5-color flecktarn has been adopted, copied and modified by many countries for their own camouflage patterns.

History 

The German Army started experimenting with camouflage patterns before World War II, and some army units used Splittermuster ("splinter pattern") camouflage, first issued in 1931. Waffen-SS combat units used various patterns from 1935 onwards. Many SS camouflage patterns were designed by Prof. Johann Georg Otto Schick.

Modern patterns 

In 1976, the Bundeswehr in Germany developed a number of prototype camouflage patterns, to be trialled as replacements for the solid olive-grey "moleskin" combat uniform.  At least four distinct camouflage patterns were tested during Bundeswehr Truppenversuch 76 ("Bundeswehr Troop Trial 76"). These were based on patterns in nature: one was called "Dots" or "Points"; another was called "Ragged Leaf" or "Saw Tooth Edge"; another was based on pine needles in winter.

Designed by the German company Marquardt & Schulz, several patterns were developed and tested by the German military. The pattern named "Flecktarn B" was chosen as the final pattern for use. The word flecktarn is a composite formed from the German words Fleck (spot, blot(ch), mark or mottle) and Tarnung (camouflage). The Bundeswehr kept its green combat dress throughout the 1980s, however, while trials were conducted. Flecktarn was only widely introduced in 1990 in a newly reunited Germany.

The Dutch government considered Flecktarn, but it was dropped due to financial and political reasons.

In Germany, the Flecktarn camouflage pattern is used by all Bundeswehr service branches, the Heer (army), the Luftwaffe (air force), some Marine (navy) units and even the Sanitätsdienst (medical service). Its official name is 5 Farben-Tarndruck der Bundeswehr (5-color camouflage print of the Bundeswehr). This temperate Flecktarn 5-color scheme consists of 15% light green, 20% light olive, 35% dark green, 20% brown and 10% black. The Dutch military tested the pattern and rejected it, allegedly because it was "too aggressive". Flecktarn was seen as controversial because of its resemblance to the Waffen-SS "peas" and "oak leaves" patterns, which also used dots in various colors.

Evolution 
Manufacturing contractors for the Bundeswehr are bound by the requirements and specifications laid out by the Bundesamt für Ausrüstung, Informationstechnik und Nutzung der Bundeswehr - BAAINBw (Federal Office of Bundeswehr Equipment, Information Technology and In-Service Support of the German Armed Forces.) The specific document that contractors must comply with is the Technische Lieferbedingungen - TL (Technical Delivery Conditions.) 

Within the TL are material performance sheets for all products conforming to civilian, ISO, and military specifications, as applicable. The TL requirements for flecktarn have undergone changes over the years and the pattern is now in its fifth iteration. The most observable changes have been to the colors, most notably from about 2005 whereupon the color screens became more separated making the pattern overall brighter. Visually the green and grey screens of post-2005 flecktarn are lighter with greater separation and the brown screen has become more of a "rust" color, whereas the former green and grey screens were darker and closer in hue and the brown screen was more of a reddish-brown. In the modern colors the black screen now presents in sharp contrast to the rest of the colors.

Multitarn replacement 

In 2016, tests were conducted by the Research Institute of materials and property of the Bundeswehr (Wehrwissenschaftliche Institut für Werk- und Betriebsstoffe – WIWeB) on a new pattern designated Multitarn as a potential replacement for flecktarn. The pattern is a 6-color fleck pattern with similar colors to Crye Precision MultiCam which has seen widespread adoption by many international Special forces including the Bundeswehr Kommando Spezialkräfte (KSK.) 

The pattern is intended as a multi-terrain pattern, initially for use only by German Special forces. The Bundeswehr initially expressed plans for adoption by multiple divisions of the Bundeswehr to compliment existing flecktarn patterns but as of 2022 this has not occurred. Unlike its previous flecktarn patterns the Bundeswehr has taken strict measures over it's property rights and distribution control to prevent unauthorized and illegal production of the pattern outside of the Bundeswehr's authorized contractors.

Variants

Belgium 
Bundeswehr flecktarn was used by airbase security and anti-aircraft units of the Belgian Air Force from 1988 to 2000. The pattern was unchanged from the original but slightly larger than the eventual Bundeswehr production pattern. It is noteworthy here that the model developed in Germany was put into general use by the Belgian Air Force almost three years before it was introduced into the Bundeswehr. A modular kit and a two-piece rucksack in flecktarn pattern was used to complete the uniform of field trousers, blouse and parka.

Denmark

Russia 
The Russian military uses a wide range of different camouflage patterns including several variations of flecktarn. One is called Sever ("north"), sometimes also referred as Flectarn-D ("D" for Denmark.) This pattern is a 3-color pattern which is almost identical to Danish M84 but the base screen is tan. The pattern was introduced in Russia in 2006, and gained popularity in the VDV (Airborne Forces) and is still in use. 

Another variant is called Tochka-4 (Point-4) produced by the Russian company Modoks. The pattern is essentially Flectarn-D with a fourth color, brown, added. 

Another pattern resembling Bundeswehr 5-color flecktarn has been used by some Russian forces with the difference being that the brown screen is red. This variant is allegedly called red flectar and may possibly be a commercial product.

In 2011 a Reconnaissance group of the 45th Separate Guards Order of Kutuzov Order of Alexander Nevsky Special Purpose Regiment of the Russian Airborne Forces was documented conducting training operations wearing a mix-and-match of kit (including Bundeswehr 5-color flecktarn), but most notably wearing a uniform in a never-before-seen digital 5-color flecktarn pattern. The pattern is not fully pixelated as is normally the case with digital patterns in that the shapes are slightly rounded. This same pattern was adopted by the Bulgarian military in 2018.

Japan 
Japan adopted a flecktarn-based pattern called Type II Camouflage, or Jietai which has been in use with the Japan Ground Self-Defense Force since 1985. This pattern is a 4-color version consisting of light green, brown and black on a beige background. A desert version is also in use.

China 
Type 03 Plateau camouflage is a 5-color flecktarn pattern that was formerly used in the early 2000s by the Chinese military in Tibet. It consists of a base color of sand with grey, light-brown, mid-brown, and black. Although the artwork is identical to the German original the Chinese version is only a portion of the complete pattern. Among collectors it is alternatively called "Tibetarn" or Tibet flecktarn. The pattern was replaced by a 4-color digitalized version called 07 Arid Camouflage ("07式荒漠迷彩作训服") in 2007.

Some Russian Special forces have also used this same pattern. The Russian version is made locally by military contractor SPLAV.

Poland 
The Samodzielny Pododdzial Antyterrorystyczny Policji - SPAP (anti-terrorism unit of the Polish National Police) have used a 5-color flecktarn variant called WZ AT 1 Plamaik, also known as Metro colloquially. The pattern is different in that it repeats itself regularly in the print at relatively short intervals. A woodland version referred to as Gepard has been used by the Agencja Bezpieczenstwa Wewnetrznego - ABW (Polish Internal Security Agency). A 5-color desert version was also developed.

A flecktarn camo made by Kama is in use by the Implementation Department, Metropolitan Police Command, Warsaw Police.

Indonesia 
In June 2022, Indonesia's Detasemen Khusus 88 Antiteror - DENSUS 88 AT (Police Counter-Terrorism Force) were seen wearing a flecktarn-influenced 6-color camouflage uniform consisting of a tan base with three shades of green along with chocolate brown and near-black. The unit’s Owl’s Head logo is discretely incorporated in the pattern.

Bulgaria 
A semi-digitized version of the original German 5-color pattern in post-2005 colors, designated M-18, was adopted by the Bulgarian army in 2018 however the same pattern was first used by some Russian Special forces Airborne troops in the early 2010s.

Yemen 
The Special Security Forces of Yemen adopted a 5-color digitalized pattern which could be said to resemble flecktarn but with darker colours similar to the pre-2005 colorway.

Commercial variants 
 In 2013, the German company Mil-Tec introduced a new version of Flecktarn, called the Arid Flecktarn. It retains the original 5-color pattern but with the color scheme resembling that of MultiCam. It remains a commercial variant and is not in use by any world military.

 German Woodland is a commercially available copy of 5-color flecktarn produced in China. The pattern is only a portion of the original Bundeswehr pattern and the green and brown screens have been inverted. On Alibaba and Aliexpress sites it is sometimes listed as flecktarn. This Chinese copy has been used by some sections of the Armed Forces of the Kyrgyz Republic as noted during the Osh ethnic clashes of 2010.

Users

 : Used by EKO Cobra as helmet covers for their Ulbrichts AM-95 helmets.
 : Flecktarn used by Belgian airbase security forces and was dropped in 2000.
 : Clones made for PLA soldiers conducting training and border defense duties.
 : Used by Bundeswehr.
 : Some used with Georgian troops in KFOR.
 : Asian clones used by Kyrgyz troops.
 : Used by some divisions of the Armed Forces of Ukraine from special forces to airborne units, including the Azov Regiment.

Non-State Actors
 Atomwaffen Division
 Kosovo Liberation Army
 Republican Resistance or Óglaigh na hÉireann (ÓnaÉ)

References

Bibliography
 
 
 
 

Camouflage patterns
German military uniforms
Military camouflage
Military equipment of Germany
Military equipment introduced in the 1990s